The 2022 Men's EuroHockey Indoor Club Cup was the 32nd edition of the Men's EuroHockey Indoor Club Cup, Europe's premier men's club indoor hockey tournament organized by the European Hockey Federation. It was held at the Alanya Atatürk Spor Salonu in Alanya, Turkey from 11 to 13 February 2022.

Teams
Participating clubs qualified based on their country's final rankings from the 2020 competition. The champions from the top six countries from last year's edition together with the top two from the 2020 EuroHockey Indoor Club Trophy were qualified. Croatia and Turkey were the two promoted countries that replaced Belgium and Sweden. Rot-Weiss Köln had to withdraw from the tournament due to several players testing positive for COVID-19.

 Rot-Weiss Köln
 AZS AWF Poznań
 Complutense
 Zelina
 Post SV
 Minsk
 Dinamo Elektrostal
 Gaziantep

Standings

Results

Top goalscorers

See also
2022 Euro Hockey League
2022 Women's EuroHockey Indoor Club Cup

References

Men's EuroHockey Indoor Club Cup
Club Cup
International field hockey competitions hosted by Turkey
EuroHockey Indoor Club Cup
EuroHockey Indoor Club Cup
Alanya